The 2010–11 Nicaraguan Professional Baseball League season finished with the Indios del Bóer winning the competition.

Standings

Semifinal Series
For the first time, a semifinal was played between the second and third placed teams.

Indios del Bóer - Orientales de Granada 3-1 wins

Final Series
Indios del Bóer - Tigres de Chinandega 4-1 wins

References

Nicaraguan Professional Baseball League
Nicaraguan Professional Baseball League
Nicaraguan Professional Baseball League
B
B